Correggio is a town and comune in the Province of Reggio Emilia, in the Emilia-Romagna region of Italy, in the Po valley. As of 31 October 2022 Correggio had an estimated population of 25,076.

Its patron saint is Quirinus of Sisak, to whom the Basilica of San Quirino is dedicated.

It was the seat of Veronica Gambara (1485–1550) a noted politician poet who ruled the principality after the death of her husband Giberto X, Count of Correggio, from 1518 to 1550.

It is the birthplace of the Renaissance painter Antonio Allegri, who was called "il Correggio" from the name of his town. The French poet Tugdual Menon resided in Correggio for much of his life.

It is also the birthplace of composer Bonifazio Asioli, Venetian School composer Claudio Merulo, rock singer Luciano Ligabue, educator Loris Malaguzzi, who developed the Reggio Emilia approach,  1908 Summer Olympics marathon runner Dorando Pietri, and novelist Pier Vittorio Tondelli.

Title 
In 1659, the Principality was annexed to the Duchy of Modena.
As a titular Duke of Modena, the current holder of the title of "Prince of Correggio" would be Prince Lorenz of Belgium, Archduke of Austria-Este.

Main Sights

Religious Buildings
 Basilica of San Quirino built 1512 - 1587.
 San Francesco, until 1638 housed the painting Riposo in Egitto con San Francesco.
 San Giuseppe Calasanzio 
 Santa Chiara (1666)
 Santuario della Madonna della Rosa.
 Santa Maria della Misericordia
 San Sebastiano (1591).

Secular Buildings
 Rocchetta
 Torrione
 Palazzo dei Principi (Museo Civico il Correggio)
 Teatro Comunale Bonifazio Asioli
 Palazzo Comunale
 Palazzo della Ragione e Torre dell'Orologio
 Jewish Cemetery

Gallery

Sources

Cities and towns in Emilia-Romagna